The Dana Award is a literary award presented in short fiction, poetry and novels. It was founded in 1996 by literature professor and poet Mary Elizabeth Parker with the financial backing of Michael Dana. The competition is based in Greensboro, North Carolina. The judges for the competition include Scottish novelist Margot Livesey.

Notable recipients include Michael Pritchett, Danielle Trussoni, Tina Chang, Paul Graham and Stephen Lovely.

Past winners

Novel
 1996 – Ellen B. Coggeshall for The Rabies Tree
 1997 – Jennifer Natalya Fink for The Mikveh Queen
 1998 – Owen Goodwyne
 1999 – Joette Hayashigawa
 2000 – Michael Pritchett for The Final Effort of the Archer
 2001 – Danielle Trussoni for Tunnel Rat
 2002 – B. K. Loren for Thicker Than Water
 2003 – Tatjana Soli for The Lotus Eaters
 2004 – Stephen Lovely for Irreplaceable
 2005 – Paul Graham for A Trained Voice
 2006 – Harvey Grossinger for The Caretaker’s Niece
 2007 – Thad Nodine for Going Home
 2008 – Rebecca Berg for Julio's Ghost
 2009 – Tippets Jensen for The Good Deed
 2010 – Patrick E. Horrigan for Portraits at an Exhibition
 2011 – Sean Murphy for Wilson's Way
 2012 – Scott Lambridis for The Many Raymond Days
 2013 – N.S. Keonings for Goatsong
 2014 – Boman Desai for The Elephant Graveyard
 2015 – Nancy Swan for Escalante Moon
 2016 – Misha Rai for Blood We Did Not Spill

Short fiction
 1999 – Jacob M. Appel
 2000 – Robert C. Goodwin
 2001 – Laren Stover
 2003 – Alma Garcia
 2004 – Glori Simmons
 2005 – Catherine Gentile
 2006 – Paula W. Peterson
 2007 – Deanne Lundin
 2008 – Patricia Brieschke
 2009 – Matthew Pitt
 2010 – Nicole Louise Reid
 2011 – Rebecca Givens Rolland
 2012 – Paul Hastings
 2013 – Skye Anicca
 2014 – BD Feil
 2015 – Brenda Peynado
 2016 – Allison Alsup

Poetry
 1996 – Tina Chang
 1997 – Sandra Stone
 1999 – Catherine M. Stearns
 2000 – K.E. Allen
 2001 – Ronald G. Wardall
 2002 – Laura Gray-Street
 2003 – Simeon Berry
 2004 – Evan Oakley
 2005 – Sam Witt
 2006 – Camille Dungy
 2007 – Sandra Stone
 2008 – Allen Braden
 2009 – Jeanne Marie Beaumont
 2010 – Julie Weber
 2011 – Jeannie Gambill
 2012 – Tom Daley
 2013 – Brandi George
 2014 – John Blair
 2015 – Rachel Dilworth
 2016 – Mark Wagenaar

Essay
 2011 – Peter Selgin

See also
 List of literary awards

Notes

American fiction awards
Awards established in 1996
American poetry awards
1996 establishments in the United States
Short story awards